Crauford Tait WS (8 April 1766 – 2 May 1832) was a 17th/18th century Scottish lawyer, improver and landowner and also a contemporary and friend of Robert Burns.

Life

He was born in Blairlogie in central Scotland on 8 April 1766 the son of John Tait WS and his wife Charlotte Murdoch.
 His father was a lawyer in Edinburgh's New Town from its first construction around 1770.

His father purchased the Harvieston estate just east of Tillicoultry in 1780 and in 1787 the house was twice visited by Robert Burns during which time he befriended Burns. During the summer visit they took a trip to the Cauldron Linn on the River Devon near Rumbling Bridge which trip Burns described as one of the best days of his life.

His father had offices in an Edinburgh townhouse at 28 Queen Street and Crawford both trained and practiced there.

He inherited the Harvieston estate in 1800 on the death of his father. He retained a substantial townhouse at 2 Park Place in Edinburgh which enabled his children to be educated there.

In 1804 he employed John Paterson to rebuild Harviestoun in the Adam style. In 1805 he purchased Dollar Glen and Castle Campbell, from his wife's uncle, consolidating the castle and leaving it as a romantic ruin as was the fashion of the day (Castle Campbell was visible from Harvieston).

In 1810 he was responsible for organising the section of the new turnpike road between Dollar and Tillicoultry (linking Stirling to Kinross and now known as the A91). When the new road was created the old road (just north of the house) became redundant other than as an access to the house.

He died on 2 May 1832 and was buried in the family burial enclosure: "Tait's Tomb" south-east of Harvieston House. Harvieston House was demolished in 1971 to avoid rates.

Family

He was married to Susan Campbell, daughter of Lord Ilay Campbell. Their ten children included Archibald Campbell Tait who became Archbishop of Canterbury.

His granddaughter Edith Murdoch Tait (1858-1936) married Randall Davidson who (partly due to Tait's influence) was later also Archbishop of Canterbury.

References
 

1766 births
1832 deaths
Scottish lawyers
Scottish landowners
Robert Burns